The greater white-fronted goose (Anser albifrons) is a species of goose related to the smaller lesser white-fronted goose (A. erythropus). It is named for the patch of white feathers bordering the base of its bill, in fact albifrons comes from the Latin albus "white" and frons "forehead".  In Europe it has been known as the white-fronted goose; in North America it is known as the greater white-fronted goose (or "greater whitefront"), and this name is also increasingly adopted internationally. Even more distinctive are the salt-and-pepper markings on the breast of adult birds, which is why the goose is colloquially called the "specklebelly" in North America.

Description
They have bright orange legs and mouse-coloured upper wing-coverts. They are smaller than greylag geese. As well as being larger than the lesser white-fronted goose, the greater white-fronted goose lacks the yellow eye-ring of that species, and the white facial blaze does not extend upwards so far as in the lesser.

The male is typical larger in size, both sexes are similar in appearance—greyish brown birds with light grey breasts dappled with dark brown to black blotches and bars. Both males and females also have a pinkish bill and orange legs and feet.

Greater white-fronted geese make a variation of sounds, but notably the most recognizable is the high pitched cackle that can be imitated by the sounds "he-he." There is a distinct breaking of the note from the first cackle to the second.

Differences between European and Greenland birds
The appearance of European or Russian white-fronted geese, of the race albifrons and Greenland white-fronted geese, of the race flavirostris, differ in a number of ways. The Greenland white-fronted goose, in all plumages, looks darker and more "oily-looking" than the European white-fronted goose, both at rest and in flight.

The following are the differences which apply to first-winter plumage:
 The mantle and scapulars of flavirostris have narrow, indistinct pale fringes creating a uniform appearance to the birds' upperparts, whereas albifrons has noticeable whitish fringes creating obviously barred upperparts
 The tertials of flavirostris have indistinct pale fringes, whereas these pale fringes are more noticeable on albifrons
 The lesser- and median-upperwing-coverts of flavirostris have narrow, indistinct pale fringes, creating a rather uniform appearance to the wing, whereas on albifrons, these fringes are prominent and broad, creating wing-bars
 The greater-coverts of flavirostris are dark grey, with a narrow white tip, forming a narrow wing-bar; on albifrons they are blue-grey, with prominent white tips, forming a bold wing-bar
 The flank-line is narrows and white on flavirostris, but broad and bright white on albifrons
 The tail of flavirostris is dark brown, with a very narrow white tip and sides; that of albifrons is dark grey, and the white tip and sides are at least double the width of the corresponding areas on flavirostris
 The bill of flavirostris is orange-yellow with a dark nail, compared with the bright pink bill of albifrons which has only a hint of dark on the nail; in addition the bill of flavirostris is longer and appears slimmer than that of albifrons

The belly-barring on adult birds is on average more extensive on flavirostris than on albifrons, but the individual variation in both forms renders this of limited use as an identification feature.

The bill of adult Greenland white-fronts are also orange-yellow at the base, but can be more pinkish-yellow on the outer-half, thus close in colour to European white-fronts; the colour difference is more easily determined in dull, flat light rather than bright sunshine.

The Greenland white-fronts are of conservation concern. While most populations have been increasing, the Greenland population has continuously declined since 2000.

Taxonomy
The greater white-fronted goose is divided into five subspecies. The nominate subspecies, the European white-fronted goose (A. a. albifrons) breeds in the far north of Europe and Asia and winters further south and west in Europe.

Three other restricted-range races occur in northern North America: Gambel's white-fronted goose (A. a. gambeli) in interior northwestern Canada and wintering on the coast of the Gulf of Mexico, slightly larger than the nominate form, the Pacific white-fronted goose  (A. a. frontalis) and the tule goose (A. a. elgasi) in southwest Alaska, largest and longest-billed of all, both wintering in California. All these races are similar in plumage, differing only in size.

The very distinct Greenland white-fronted goose (A. a. flavirostris) breeding in western Greenland, is much darker overall, with only a very narrow white tip to the tail (broader on the other races), more black barring on its belly and usually has an orange (not pink) bill. It winters in Ireland and western Scotland.

Birds breeding in the far east of Siberia east to Arctic Canada, wintering in the United States and Japan, have been described as A. a. frontalis on the basis of their slightly larger size and a marginally longer bill. Another putative East Asian subspecies (A. a. albicans) has also been described. A 2012 study has found that frontalis and albicans do not merit subspecies status, the former being synonymised with gambeli and the latter with the nominate subspecies; this study found that these forms had been named on the wintering grounds from specimens whose breeding grounds were unknown.

Ecological studies in 2002 suggest the Greenland birds should probably be considered a separate species from A. albifrons. Of particular interest is its unusually long period of parental care and association, which may last several years and can include grandparenting, possibly unique among the Anseriformes.

Distribution

The North American midcontinent birds of the subspecies A. a. gambeli – which in 2010 had a fall population of about 710,000 birds – breeds from the Alaska North Slope across the western and central Canadian Arctic. The Pacific white-fronted goose of the American Pacific coast, which in 2010 numbered approximately 650,000 birds, and the tule geese, which are estimated to number 10,000 birds, nest in western Alaska. The midcontinent geese gather in early fall on the prairies of western Saskatchewan and eastern Alberta, spending several weeks feeding before heading to wintering areas near the Gulf of Mexico, into northern Mexico. The Pacific birds migrate south down the Pacific coast, staging primarily in the Klamath Basin of southern Oregon and northern California and wintering, eventually, in California's Central Valley. The tule goose is somewhat rare and has been since the latter half of the 19th century, presumably it was affected by destruction of its wintering habitat due to human settlement.

In the British Isles, two races overwinter: Greenland birds in Scotland and Ireland, and Russian birds in England and Wales. They gather on farmland at favoured traditional sites, with a famous flock gathering at WWT Slimbridge, Gloucestershire, England. Greenland birds also overwinter in Ireland and from late September and through the winter months, Ireland is home to almost 50% of the Greenland population of white-fronted geese.

A. a. albifrons and A. a. flavirostis are among the taxa to which the Agreement on the Conservation of African-Eurasian Migratory Waterbirds (AEWA) applies.

Behaviour and ecology 
Weather conditions are a key factor in the annual breeding success of white-fronted geese. In the Arctic, the window of opportunity for nesting, incubating eggs, and raising a brood to flight state is open briefly, for about three months. Arriving in late May or early June, white-fronted geese begin departing for fall staging areas in early September. This means that a delayed snowmelt or late spring storm can significantly reduce the birds' reproductive success.

Origin of migration 
Midcontinental white-fronted geese in North America have many breeding areas and each group in each breeding area differs in its migration time and wintering location. There are six breeding areas, including interior Alaska, the North Slope of Alaska, western Northwest Territories, western Nunavut, central Nunavut, and eastern Nunavut. These spatial differences lead to different departure times for white-fronted geese leaving their breeding areas. Birds from interior Alaska start migrating earlier during autumn and fly farther south to winter. Due to their migration, white-fronted geese are commonly sought after by waterfowl hunters, all across the country.

Backtracking technique 
 
One technique to identify the migratory flight path of individual birds using isotopes was developed by a researcher from Austrian Institute of Technology named Micha Horacek.  Horacek thought the different types of feathers growing on a single migratory bird could be a way to backtrack the migratory route of individual birds infected by avian flu to help locate areas that may become infected. This allows the affected area to be measured and marked. Bird feather growth can be used as timeline for nutritional intake during the migratory flight understand the route which the infected bird took and determine the region affected by that particular bird flu. During migratory flight, feathers on white-fronted geese gradually fall off during migration as new feathers grow (a process called moulting). Each location visited by a bird has its own distinct isotopic signature of elements (including carbon, hydrogen, nitrogen, and sulfur) that can be taken up by migratory birds ingesting food from that area. These isotopes can be studied by collecting feathers and performing thermal combustion analysis. Because different types of feathers have different growth rates, the growth rates can be used to determine the relative time during which each isotope signal was picked up. Each isotope signal in turn can be compared to the signatures present in the different environments where the goose may have fed.

Gallery

References

External links

 White-fronted goose facts on the website of RSPB
 Greater white-fronted goose at "All About Birds" (Cornell Lab of Ornithology)
 White-fronted Goose – Anser albifrons – USGS Patuxent Bird Identification InfoCenter
 
 
 

greater white-fronted goose
greater white-fronted goose
Birds of the Arctic
Natural monuments of Japan
greater white-fronted goose
greater white-fronted goose
Articles containing video clips
Holarctic birds